Fritz Jungblut (born 19 August 1907, date of death unknown) was a German speed skater. He competed in three events at the 1928 Winter Olympics.

References

1907 births
Year of death missing
German male speed skaters
Olympic speed skaters of Germany
Speed skaters at the 1928 Winter Olympics
Sportspeople from Munich